Leyli Daghi (also Romanized as Leylī Dāghī) is a village in Gavdul-e Sharqi Rural District, in the Central District of Malekan County, East Azerbaijan Province, Iran. At the 2006 census, its population was 60, in 12 families.

References 

Populated places in Malekan County